La Palette is a café and brasserie-type restaurant in the 6th arrondissement of Paris, France. It is listed as a Historic Monument.

Description
The establishment has two rooms: the tiny bar room, and the larger back room that is adorned with ceramics of the 1930–40s and numerous paintings.

The café was originally a gathering place for students of the nearby Fine Arts National Higher School. Paul Cézanne, Pablo Picasso and Georges Braque were among the regular patrons. More recently, La Palette became a trendy place and attracted Parisian youth as well as tourists. Former French President Jacques Chirac was a regular patron of La Palette.

La Palette'''s front window and back room were listed as a Historical Monument on May 23, 1984.

In Paul Auster's novel Invisible (2009), the main character went to La Palette'' several times.

The café’s bar room served as a filming location for Taylor Swift’s “Begin Again” music video (2012).

The café is located close to station Mabillon of Paris Métro Line 10.

Gallery

See also
List of monuments historiques in Paris

References

Coffeehouses and cafés in Paris
French restaurants in France
Buildings and structures in the 6th arrondissement of Paris
Monuments historiques of Paris